was a Japanese professional sumo wrestler from Toyama City, Toyama Prefecture. He was the sport's 20th yokozuna. Umegatani had a great rivalry with fellow yokozuna Hitachiyama Taniemon. Their era was known as the Ume-Hitachi Era and it brought sumo to heights of popularity never before seen in the Meiji period.

Career

He was adopted by the 15th yokozuna Umegatani Tōtarō I and joined his Ikazuchi stable in June 1892 at the age of 14. His father was initially reluctant to let him join at such a young age but Umegatani Tōtarō I personally guaranteed his well-being.

In the stable, he was trained by Onigatani. He rose through the ranks quickly, making his jūryō debut in January 1897 and reaching the top makuuchi division in January 1898. He met Hitachiyama in May 1903 when both ōzeki were undefeated. The clash caused great excitement throughout Japan. Although Umegatani lost the match, after the tournament both he and Hitachiyama were promoted to yokozuna, Umegatani's promotion being awarded at Hitachiyama's insistence.

Umegatani had reached sumo's highest rank at the age of 25 years and 3 months, making him the youngest ever yokozuna at that time. The record stood until the promotion of Terukuni in 1942.

He had the best record in at least three championships before June 1909, when the yūshō system was established by the Mainichi Shimbun newspaper (the Japan Sumo Association officially recognised the system in 1926). There were two other instances where Umegatani achieved championship level performances not recorded as such by all sources. In the first, in the summer 1898 tournament, Umegatani tied ōzeki Asashio Taro I with a 7-1-1-1draw record. Also, in the spring 1904 tournament, Umegatani finished with a record of 7-1-1 and 1 hold, slightly better than west yokozuna Hitachiyama Taniemon's 7-1-2 record, and a number of sources include this as an unofficial championship. Umegatani had the best record in the 1909 spring tournament, the last tournament before the yūshō system began in June 1909. Although he did not win any championships officially, he was given a prize frame in honor of his contribution when he retired in June 1915. This was his prize frame for his career from between the June 1909 tournament and the January 1910 tournament. His bouts were more masterly than his record because his techniques were orthodox methods. Although he was extremely heavy for his short height, he showed great skill.

He missed many bouts in his later career due to illness, retiring at the age of 37. In the top makuuchi division, he won 168 bouts and lost 27 bouts, recording a winning percentage of 86.2. So many people wished to attend his retirement ceremony that it was held over three days. He died at the age of 49 whilst still active in sumo as a judge and head of Ikazuchi stable. The stable folded upon his death.

Top division record
Some sources record two more of Umegatani's tournaments as having won or tied the tournament.  See above.

  
    
    
  
    
    
    
  
  
    
    
  
  
    
    
  
  
    
    
  
  
    
    
  
  
    
    
  
  
    
    
  
  
    
    
  
  
    
    
  
  
    
    
  
  
    
    
  
  
    
    
  
  
    
    
  
  
    
    
  
  
    
    
  
  
    
    
  
  
    
    
  

*Championships for the best record in a tournament were not recognized or awarded before the 1909 summer tournament and the above unofficial championships are historically conferred. For more information see yūshō.

See also
Glossary of sumo terms
List of past sumo wrestlers
List of yokozuna

References

External links

 Article on Umegatani II

1878 births
1927 deaths
Japanese sumo wrestlers
Yokozuna
People from Toyama (city)
Sumo people from Toyama Prefecture